Paul Jaffe (born 1973) is an American electrical engineer who works in the Spacecraft Engineering Department, United States Naval Research Laboratory.  He is known for research on power beaming and space-based solar power.  His Thesis (2013) is "A Sunlight to Microwave Power Transmission Module Prototype for Space Solar Power."

One of his specialties is building and testing space modules.

In March 2016 Jaffe and team member Col. Peter Garretson (USAF) won award categories during the first Department of Defense ‘Diplomacy, Development, and Defense (D3) Innovation Challenge.

He is the principal investigator for a space experiment that was launched into space in May 2020, and which is providing data to inform the development of solar power satellite technology.

References

Living people
1973 births
American electrical engineers